Two Wrongs Make a Right is a 2017 Chinese-Hong Kong romantic comedy film written and directed by Vincent Kok, starring Vic Chou, Fiona Sit and Ronald Cheng.

Cast
 Vic Chou as Qin Rui
 Fiona Sit as He Peipei
 Ronald Cheng as Ximen Ding
 Tien Niu as Peipei's mother
 Jack Kao as Qin Rui's father
 Joy Sheng

Soundtrack

See also
My Lucky Star (2003), a feng shui-themed film by Vincent Kok

References

External links
 
 
 

2017 films
2017 romantic comedy films
2010s Cantonese-language films
2010s Mandarin-language films
Chinese romantic comedy films
Hong Kong romantic comedy films
Films directed by Vincent Kok
2010s Hong Kong films